The 2022 Paris Motor Show (in French Mondial de l'automobile de Paris or Mondial de l'Auto) is an international auto show, which was held from October 18 to October 23, 2022, at the Paris Expo Porte de Versailles, in Paris, France. 

It is part of Paris Automotive Week, bringing together the Motor Show and the Equip Auto trade show.

Presentation
The 2022 show celebrates the 124th anniversary of the "International Automobile, Cycle and Sports Exhibition" born in Paris in 1898, and the 121st edition since its creation.

The "2022 Paris Motor Show", the direct heir of this event, is the largest motor show in the world in terms of longevity and attendance, but also one of the rare motor shows to still exist today.

The poster for this 2022 edition was unveiled in March of the same year. It includes bright colours which, according to the organization, represent “a wind of optimism, with a new vision of the automobile”. The slogan is "Revolution is on" ("La révolution est en marche" in French).

Taking place over a single week, attendance is in free fall with 397,812 paid admissions, whereas previous editions exceeded one million admissions.

It is also the most decried edition by the public and the press, with the absence of many manufacturers, where it is quicker to count the present than the absent, and the little surface area devoted to cars with only 3 exhibition halls but without the historical Hall 1.

The event organiser is planning a 2024 edition with more manufacturers and over a two-week period.

Attendance
The show takes place for the public from 9:30 a.m. to 10:30 p.m. from October 18 to 23, 2022 (7 p.m. on Sundays), October 17 being dedicated only to the international press, and the Equip Auto show ends on October 22.

Exhibitors
The show is exhibited in halls 3, 4 and 6 of the Parc des Expositions de la porte de Versailles in Paris.

Manufacturers present this year:

  Alpine
  BYD
  Dacia
  Devalliet
  DS Automobiles
  Fisker Inc.
  Hopium
  Jeep
  Micro Mobility Systems
  Mobilize
  NamX
  Ora
  Peugeot
  Renault
  Seres
  Vinfast
  Wey

Manufacturers absent this year:

  Abarth
  Alfa Romeo
  Aston Martin
  Audi
  Bentley
  BMW
  Citroën
  Cupra
  Ferrari
  Ford
  Honda
  Hyundai
  Infiniti
  Isuzu
  Jaguar
  Kia
  Land Rover
  Lamborghini
  Lexus
  Ligier
  Lotus
  Maserati
  Mercedes-Benz
  Mini
  Opel
  Porsche
  Rolls-Royce
  SEAT
  Škoda
  Volkswagen
  Volvo

Introductions

Production cars
 Alpine A110 R
 BYD Atto 3
 BYD Dolphin
 BYD Han
 BYD Seal
 BYD Tang
 Caselani Citroën Berlingo Fourgonnette
 
 DFSK EC35
 DS 3 - refresh
 DS 4 - update
 DS 7 - refresh
 DS 9 Opéra Première
 Dacia Duster - refresh
 Dacia Duster Mat Edition
 Dacia Jogger - refresh
 Dacia Jogger Hybrid - only the drivetrain
 Dacia Logan - refresh
 Dacia Sandero - refresh
 Dacia Sandero Stepway - refresh
 Dacia Spring - refresh
 Devalliet Mugello
 e.GO e.wave x
 Fisker Ocean
 Genty Akylone
 Jeep Avenger
 Kilow La Bagnole
 Leapmotor C11
 Leapmotor T03
 Lormauto electric Renault Twingo
 Maxus eDeliver 9
 Mega e-Scouty
 Mobilize Bento
 Mobilize Duo
 Ora Funky Cat
 Ora Funky Cat GT
 Ora Next Cat
 Pantore Vakog
 Peugeot 408
 Peugeot 508 PSE
 Peugeot e-208
 Renault Austral
 Renault Kangoo E-Tech Electric
 Renault Master Van H2-Tech
 Renault Mégane E-Tech Electric
 Seres 3
 Seres 5
 
 Sportequipe S8
 VinFast VF 5
 VinFast VF 6
 VinFast VF 7
 VinFast VF 8
 VinFast VF 9
 Weez City-Pro
 WEY Coffee 01
 WEY Coffee 02
 XEV Yoyo

Concept cars

 Alpine A110 E-ternité
 Alpine Alpenglow
 Beltoise BT01
 CID Babieca
 Capgemini Chatenet
 DS E-Tense Performance
 Dacia Manifesto
 Hopium Māchina Vision
 Jeep Avenger 4xe
 KGM ERC140
 Microlino Lite
 Microlino Spiaggina
 NamX HUV
 Peugeot 9X8
 Peugeot Inception - announced
 Raffer TB-02
 Renault 4Ever Trophy
 Renault Hippie Caviar Motel
 Renault R5 Turbo 3E
 Renault Scénic Vision
 Vilebrequin 1000tipla
 Weez City-4

Vehicles available for test drive:
 BYD Atto 3, Tang, Han and Song
 Citroën ë-Jumpy and ë-Jumpy Hydrogen
 DFSK C35
 Ford Mustang Mach-E
 Ford e-Transit
 Hyundai Nexo
 Maxus 3 and 9
 Peugeot e-Expert and e-Expert Hydrogen
 Renault Master (20 m3)
 Renault Trucks E-Tech D (16 t)
 Seres 3
 Toyota Mirai

Miscellaneous
 Aircode DRS Lapierre x Alpine
 Lego Lamborghini Sián FKP 37
 Peugeot e-Streetzone

Incident
Protesters from the French faction of Extinction Rebellion glued themselves to some Ferrari cars on display, after a similar incident happened earlier in Germany.

See also

 2018 Paris Motor Show
 Tokyo Motor Show
 International Motor Show Germany
 Geneva Motor Show

References

External links

 
 Press kit

Motor Show
Paris Motor Show
Paris Motor Show